Thrimby is a hamlet and former civil parish, now in the parish of Little Strickland, in the Eden district of Cumbria, England. In 2001 the population of the civil parish of Thrimby was 30. The population measured at the 2011 Census was less than 100. Details are included in the parish of Great Strickland. It has a Grade 2* farmhouse called Thrimby Hall, as seen in series 4 of the BBC Two fly-on-the-wall farming documentary "This Farming Life".

History
On 23 October 1970, the nine-mile Tebay to Thrimby section of the M6 was opened, built by Christiani-Shand. The section terminated on the A6. The next junction further north would be at Penrith (A66). Thrimby was a chapelry with 2 townships within Morland parish, it became a civil parish in 1866, on 1 April 2019 the parish was merged with Little Strickland.

See also

 Listed buildings in Thrimby
 List of English and Welsh endowed schools (19th century)

References

External links 

 Cumbria County History Trust: Thrimby (nb: provisional research only – see Talk page)
 http://www.genuki.org.uk/big/eng/WES/Thrimby/index.htm
 http://www.britishlistedbuildings.co.uk/england/cumbria/thrimby
 https://books.google.com/books?id=fvmpPRwVc_IC&pg=PA438&dq=thrimby&hl=en&ei=5rouTsLULMzu-gbds8nLDg&sa=X&oi=book_result&ct=result&resnum=3&ved=0CDMQ6AEwAg#v=onepage&q=thrimby&f=false
 http://www.visitcumbria.com/churches/little-strickland-st-marys-church.htm
 http://www.morlandchurch.org.uk/thrimby/index.htm
 http://www.achurchnearyou.com/thrimby-st-mary/

Hamlets in Cumbria
Former civil parishes in Cumbria
Little Strickland